Desnitro-imidacloprid is a metabolite of the insecticide imidacloprid, a very common insecticide and the most important member of the class of insecticides called neonicotinoids, the only significant new class of insecticides to be developed between 1970 and 2000.  While imidacloprid has proved highly selective against insects, the desnitro- version is highly toxic to mammals, due to its agonist action at the alpha4beta2 nicotinic acetylcholine receptor (nAChR) in the mammalian brain, at least as demonstrated in experiments involving mice.

References

 Insecticides
Imidazolines
Chloropyridines